The Furneaux Group is a group of approximately 100 islands located at the eastern end of Bass Strait, between Victoria and Tasmania, Australia. The islands were named after British navigator Tobias Furneaux, who sighted the eastern side of these islands after leaving Adventure Bay in 1773 on his way to New Zealand to rejoin Captain James Cook.

The largest islands in the group are Flinders Island, Cape Barren Island, and Clarke Island. The group contains five settlements:
Killiecrankie, Emita, Lady Barron, Cape Barren Island, and Whitemark on Flinders Island, which serves as the administrative centre of the Flinders Council. There are also some small farming properties on the remote islands.

After seals were discovered there in 1798, the Furneaux Group of islands became the most intensively exploited sealing ground in Bass Strait. A total of 29 islands in the Furneaux Group have been found to have some tangible link with sealing in the 19th century.

The Aboriginal matriarch, Dolly Dalrymple, was born on the Furneaux Islands. Her mother was one of two Aboriginal women who had been kidnapped from northern Tasmania by the sealer George Briggs.

King Island, at the western end of Bass Strait, is not a part of the group.

Administration
The Furneaux Group forms the Flinders Council together with the groups of islands to the northwest: the Kent Group, Hogan Island Group, Curtis Group, and the Tasmanian part of the Wilsons Promontory Islands.

Islands in the Group

Geology
The islands contain granite from the Devonian period, as well as unconsolidated limestone and sand from Cenozoic periods.  During the last ice age, a land bridge joined Tasmania to the Australian mainland through this group of islands.

See also

 Furneaux bioregion
 Engaeus martigener 
 List of islands of Tasmania

References

External links 
 Birds of the Furneaux Islands
 Shipwrecks in the Furneaux Islands

 
Seal hunting